= Bannon, Arizona =

Community in Apache County, Arizona

Coordinates: 34.2539°N 109.7426°W

Bannon was an unincorporated community in Apache County, Arizona, United States. It is now a ghost town.

== History ==
A post office called Bannon was established in 1920, and remained in operation until 1942. The community has the name of James Bannon, a pioneer citizen.
